Ajit Kumar may refer to:

Ajit Kumar (born 1997), Indian Sufi Singer
From Bokaro Steel  City , Jharkhand